Lemon delicious pudding is an Australian and New Zealand dessert. As the pudding bakes, it separates, and the bottom remains a liquid lemony sauce while the top becomes fluffy and sponge-like. Similar recipes can be found in English cookbooks as far back as the 17th century.

References

Australian desserts
New Zealand desserts
Lemon dishes